Zosteria sydneensis is a species of robberfly found in Sydney, Australia.

Description
First described by Macquart in 1838.

Range
Sydney, Australia and nearby.

Habitat

Ecology

Etymology
Sydneyeensis refers to Sydney.

Taxonomy

References

Asilidae
Insects described in 1838